Ognen Stojanovski (born January 25, 1984) is a Macedonian professional basketball player. He was under contract with MZT Skopje until 2014. He is 1.91 m (6 ft 3 in) in height and plays at the point guard position.

Born in Skopje, Republic of Macedonia, he is older brother of the twins Vojdan Stojanovski and Damjan Stojanovski, who are also basketball players.

Achievements
 Rabotnički
Macedonian League Champion - 2003, 2004, 2005, 2006, 2009
Macedonian Cup Winner - 2003, 2004, 2005, 2006
 Feni Industries
Macedonian League Champion - 2010, 2011
Macedonian Cup Winner - 2010
 MZT Skopje
Macedonian League Champion - 2012, 2013, 2014
Macedonian Cup Winner - 2012, 2013, 2014

References

1984 births
Living people
ABA League players
KK MZT Skopje players
KK Rabotnički players
Macedonian men's basketball players
Point guards
Sportspeople from Skopje